R20 may refer to:

Roads 
 R-20 regional road (Montenegro)
 Small Ring, Brussels, a ring road in Belgium

Other uses 
 Chloroform, a refrigerant
 , a destroyer of the Royal Canadian Navy and Royal Navy
 R20: Harmful by inhalation, a risk phrase
 R20 battery, a dry cell battery
 R20 Regions of Climate Action, a nonprofit environmental organization
 R20 series, preferred numbers in industrial design
 Renault 20, a French executive car
 Small nucleolar RNA R20
 Toyota TownAce (R20), a Japanese van
 , a 1918 submarine of the United States Navy